George Frederick Burton (10 September 1871 – 1944) was an English footballer who played in the Football League for Aston Villa.

References

1871 births
1944 deaths
English footballers
Association football wing halves
English Football League players
Walsall F.C. players
Aston Villa F.C. players
Bristol Rovers F.C. players